The 2013 Women's World Open Squash Championship is the women's edition of the 2013 World Open, which serves as the individual world championship for squash players. The event took place at the PISA Stadium in Penang in Malaysia from 14 March to 21 March 2014. Laura Massaro won her first World Open title, beating Nour El Sherbini in the final.

Prize money and ranking points
For 2013, the prize purse was $120,000. The prize money and points breakdown is as follows:

Seeds

Draw and results

See also
World Open
2013 Men's World Open Squash Championship

References

External links
World Championship 2013 official website
WSA World Open 2013 website
WSA World Open 2013 SquashSite page

World Squash Championships
W
Squash tournaments in Malaysia
2013 in Malaysian women's sport
2013 in women's squash
International sports competitions hosted by Malaysia